Heidolph Instruments is a manufacturer of laboratory equipment with a presence in more than 100 countries. It sells equipment to laboratories in pharmaceutical research, cosmetics, biology, biofuel, chemical industries and universities worldwide.

Business 

Heidolph Instruments, founded in 1938 as a manufacturer of precision drive motors and engineering, is a manufacturer of laboratory equipment specializing in rotary evaporation, shakers, overhead stirrers, peristaltic pumps and magnetic hotplate stirrers. The organization is headquartered in Schwabach, a city in proximity to Nuremberg, Germany. It is there that the development and production of equipment; as well as the coordination of sales, and customer support activities are located.

Heidolph North America is a subsidiary of Heidolph GmbH, founded as Heidolph Brinkmann LLC in 2008. Heidolph North America supports and services Heidolph Tuttnauer Autoclaves, Heidolph Radleys synthesis tools, along with their complete line of Heidolph products. The organization's headquarters is located just outside of Chicago, IL.

Product Divisions

Rotary Evaporators

Magnetic Stirrers

Overhead Stirrers

Shakers and Mixers

Vortexers

Peristaltic Pumps

Sterilizers

In fiction 
 Heidolph Rotary Evaporators can be seen in the 2012 comedy The 5 Year Engagement and the 2012 comic based movie The Avengers during the lab scene on the ship. 
 Heidolph Laborota evaporator and Modular concept shaker was shown several times in the 2009 Sci- Fi movie, Splice. The evaporator can be seen in the lab scene when Sarah Polley is doing research.
 In Avatar, a 2009 American epic science fiction film, the Heidolph rotary evaporator is used in one of their many laboratories.
 The rotary evaporator can be seen in the I Am Legend movie, in the basement of Will Smith's protected home lab.

References 

 https://www.nytimes.com/2009/12/02/dining/02curious.html?ref=todayspaper

External links 
 http://www.revamp.com/story.php?StoryID=1337

Medical technology companies of Germany
Laboratory equipment manufacturers
Manufacturing companies of Germany
Medical and health organisations based in Bavaria